Solwezi Airport  is an airport serving Solwezi, a city in the North-Western Province of Zambia. The airport is the largest in the province and was upgraded by Kansanshi Mining PLC with the addition of a new runway able to handle the Boeing 737. Prior to the runway being upgraded there was a small 1200 meter runway not able to handle large aircraft, but with the upgrade of the runway after the mining boom, Proflight Zambia was able to deploy the British Aerospace Jetstream 41 to Solwezi. Also, the newly revived national carrier, Zambia Airways, has begun service from Lusaka to Solwezi utilizing a Dash 8-400.

Location 
The airport is located a few kilometers north off the T5, the main road in the area, and approximately 4 kilometres (2mi) northwest of the city centre of Solwezi, the capital and largest city in the North-Western Province.

Airlines and destinations

Infrastructure 
The runway at Solwezi airport is a 2,700m (8,858 ft) asphalt runway with  paved overruns on the east and west ends respectively to keep aircraft from overrunning the runway. Solwezi also has a non-directional beacon (Ident: SW) is located on the field to help aircraft navigate towards the airport.

See also
Transport in Zambia
List of airports in Zambia

References

External links
OpenStreetMap - Solwezi
OurAirports - Solwesi
FallingRain - Solwesi Airport

Airports in Zambia
Solwezi
Solwezi District
Buildings and structures in North-Western Province, Zambia